Joona Voutilainen (born November 17, 1996) is a Finnish professional ice hockey goaltender who currently plays for IF Björklöven in the HockeyAllsvenskan (Allsv).

References

External links

1996 births
Living people
IF Björklöven players
HPK players
JYP Jyväskylä players
KooKoo players
Lahti Pelicans players
Peliitat Heinola players
Sportspeople from Espoo
Finnish ice hockey goaltenders